Copper Hill is an unincorporated community located within the Amwell Valley of Raritan Township in Hunterdon County, New Jersey. It is located between Flemington and Ringoes along U.S. Route 202, New Jersey Route 31 and Copper Hill Road. It was named for the old copper mines in the area.

History
Copper Hill had a post office in 1860. It had a station stop on the Flemington branch of the Belvidere Delaware Railroad. The Black River and Western Railroad now operates on the line.

Education
The Flemington-Raritan Regional School District operates the Copper Hill Elementary School in the community.

References

Raritan Township, New Jersey
Unincorporated communities in Hunterdon County, New Jersey
Unincorporated communities in New Jersey